GEOHAB is an international research programme on the Global Ecology and Oceanography of Harmful algal blooms. 

It was initiated in 1998 by the Scientific Committee on Oceanic Research (of ICSU) and the Intergovernmental Oceanographic Commission of UNESCO.

References

Publications 
GEOHAB Science Plan
GEOHAB Implementation Plan, Upwelling Systems
Core Research Plan: HABs in Upwelling Systems
Core Research Project Implementation Plan: HABs in Upwelling Systems
Open Science Meeting on HABs in Upwelling Systems, Programme Book and Abstracts, Eutrophic Systems 
Core Research Plan: HABs in Eutrophic Systems
Open Science Meeting on HABs in Eutrophic Coastal and Estuarine Systems, Programme Book and Abstracts
Fjords and Coastal Embayments
Core Research Plan: HABs in Fjords and Coastal Embayments
Open Science Meeting on HABs in Fjords and Coastal Embayments, Programme Book and Abstracts
Stratified Systems 
Core Research Plan: HABs in Stratified Systems
Open Science Meeting on HABs in Stratified Systems, Programme Book and Abstracts

External links 
 GEOHAB Website

Algal blooms
UNESCO